Bass River Point is a community in Weldford Parish located 4.25 km ESE of Molus River.
Today the area is home to the largest farming operations remaining in the community and one of the largest in New Brunswick, Shipyard Farms. Bass River Point is a popular spot for trout fishing and enjoying country living.

History

Bass River Point had a Post Office from 1915 to 1956. Today the area is hg.

Notable people

See also
List of communities in New Brunswick

References

Communities in Kent County, New Brunswick